Strange Brotherhood was released in 1998 and is the seventh studio album by British rock band, New Model Army and the first on their own independent label, Attack Attack Records.

The album was produced by Simon Dawson except for the tracks "Whites of Their Eyes" and "Queen of My Heart" which were produced by Mike Gregovich. The album featured the guest guitarist, Dave Blomberg, and also an orchestral arrangement.

This album is also notable in being the last studio album to feature long-serving New Model Army member Robert Heaton.

Singles
"Wonderful Way to Go" was released as a single in March 1998 with two separate releases as "Part One of Two" and "Part Two of Two"  and "Queen of My Heart" and "Brother" were released as a double A-side in May 1998.

Versions
The album was originally released as a 12-track CD in May 1998 along with a limited edition digipak two CD version including sticker and lyric booklet. The bonus CD containing "See You in Hell", "Sunset", and live versions of "Ballad of Bodmin Pill" and "The Hunt".

A limited edition fan club version was released in July 1998 as a triple LP with the original tracks on the first two records and adding the tracks "Brother", "Southwest", "Rainy Night 65", "Refugee", "Sunset", "Caslen" and "See You in Hell" on the third record.

Track listing

Standard CD version
"Wonderful Way to Go" (Justin Sullivan, Robert Heaton) – 5:44
"Whites of Their Eyes" (Sullivan, Heaton) – 4:41
"Aimless Desire" (Sullivan, Heaton) – 5:05
"Over the Wire" (Sullivan, Heaton) – 3:27
"Queen of My Heart" (Sullivan, Heaton) – 4:15
"Gigabyte Wars" (Sullivan, Heaton) – 4:15
"Killing" (Sullivan, Heaton, Nelson, Dave Blomberg) – 5:43
"No Pain" (Sullivan) – 4:55
"Headlights" (Sullivan, Heaton, Nelson) – 5:35
"Big Blue" (Sullivan, Heaton) – 4:21
"Long Goodbye" (Sullivan) – 3:18
"Lullaby" (Sullivan) – 5:40

Bonus CD
"See You in Hell" (Sullivan, Heaton)
"Sunset" (Sullivan)
"Ballad of Bodmin Pill" (live) (Sullivan, Heaton)
"The Hunt" (live) (Sullivan, Heaton)

Third record from fan club edition

Side one
"Brother" (Sullivan)
"Southwest" (Sullivan)
"Rainy Night 65" (Sullivan, Heaton)

Side two
"Refugee"  (Sullivan, Heaton)
"Sunset" (Sullivan, Heaton)
"Caslen" (Nelson)
"See You in Hell" (Sullivan, Heaton)

Personnel
Justin Sullivan – vocals, guitar, keyboards, harmonica
Robert Heaton – drums, guitar, synthesizer, harmonica, backing vocals
Nelson – bass, guitar, percussion, violin, backing vocals
Dave Blomberg – guitar, keyboards, backing vocals
Dean White – keyboards, clarinet
Rachel Auty (her name was mistyped on the cd release and said Hunter. It was corrected on the vinyl release), Tobias Unterberg, Samantha Rowe, Ed Wolstenholme, Becky Pugh – string section
Ed Collins, Simon Pugsley, Stuart Edge – brass section

Production
Simon Dawson – producer ("Wonderful Way to Go", "Aimless Desire", "Over the Wire", "Gigabyte Wars", "Killing", "No Pain", "Headlights", "Big Blue", "Long Goodbye", "Lullaby"), mixed by ("No Pain", "Big Blue")
Mike Gregovich – producer ("White of Their Eyes", "Queen of My Heart"), mixed by ("Wonderful Way to Go", "Whites of Their Eyes", "Queen of My Heart", "Gigabyte Wars", "Killing", "Headlights", "Long Goodbye", "Lullaby")
Mark Dodson – mixed by ("Aimless Desire", "Over the Wire")
Dave Blomberg – editor

References

External links
Official NMA website

New Model Army (band) albums
1998 albums